Ebenshausen is a village and a former municipality in the Wartburgkreis district of Thuringia, Germany. Since December 2019, it is part of the town Amt Creuzburg.

References

Wartburgkreis
Saxe-Coburg and Gotha
Former municipalities in Thuringia